Muricanthus ambiguus is a species of sea snail, a marine gastropod mollusc in the family Muricidae, the murex snails or rock snails.

Distribution
This marine species occurs in the Central and southern Gulf of California to the Pearl Islands, Panama.

References

External links
 Reeve, L. A. (1845-1849). Monograph of the genus Murex. In: Conchologia Iconica: or, illustrations of the shells of molluscous animals, vol. 3, pls 1-37 and unpaginated text. L. Reeve & Co., London.

Muricidae
Gastropods described in 1845